Le Houlme is a commune in the Seine-Maritime department in the Normandy region in northern France.

Geography
SNCF operates a TER service here. The town is located in a place where the Cailly's valley is beginning to narrow. Thus, the town extends from the Cailly's valley to the beginning of the plateau of Normandy, with some housings located on the cliffs leading to the plateau itself.

Population

Places of interest
 The church of St.Martin, dating from the nineteenth century, an interesting example of neo-gothic architectural style.
 The war memorial, on the central square of the town ("Place des Canadiens", referring to the Canadian soldiers who were the first of the Allies to step in the town at the end of World War II).
 In the streets closer to the Cailly River, it is possible to see several typical factory worker houses from the 19th century, reminding the industrial past of the town and of the Cailly River's valley.

See also
Communes of the Seine-Maritime department

References

Communes of Seine-Maritime